Durduc River may refer to:

Durduc, a tributary of the Săuzeni in Iași County, Romania
Durduc, another name for the Stavnic, a tributary of the Bârlad in Iași County and Vaslui County, Romania